Lago Bianco (literally "White Lake" in Italian) is a reservoir at the Bernina pass in the Swiss canton of Graubünden.

Geography 
Once the site of two smaller lakes (Lago Bianco and Lago della Scala), the current reservoir was formed by the constructions of two dams (Scala and Arlas) at its southern and northern ends. The current lake drains to the south, as did both its precursor lakes, with its water eventually reaching the Mediterranean via the rivers Poschiavino, Adda and Po. By contrast, Lej Nair, just below the northern dam. drains north into the Black Sea via the rivers Inn and Danube.

The summit of the Bernina railway line, which is the highest mountain crossing railway in Europe, runs alongside the eastern side of the lake, with the Ospizio Bernina station at roughly the mid-point. The road across the Bernina pass (Hauptstrasse 29) follows a higher route on the same side of the lake. Most of the lake lies within the municipality of Poschiavo, although the most northerly section and the northern dam lie within the municipality of Pontresina.

The Lago Bianco reservoir was created between 1910 and 1911 in order to provide a constant supply of water to a series of hydro-electric power plants in the Val Poschiavo. However, in 1927 two power stations were built between the lake and Cavaglia.

This would have a total installed capacity of 1000 MW and would consume electricity to pump water to the higher level at times of low demand and release water to generate electricity in times of high demand. The proposals have received formal consent from the cantonal authorities, but  are not believed to be financially viable.

See also
List of lakes of Switzerland
List of mountain lakes of Switzerland

References

Lakes of Graubünden
Poschiavo
Reservoirs in Switzerland